Suç Bende (My Fault) is the debut album released in 1994 of the Turkish pop singer Mustafa Sandal. This was the album that launched him onto the Turkish pop scene.

Track listing

Credits
 Music direction, arrangements: Mustafa Sandal, Sarp Özdemiroğlu
 Mixing: Pinjo Deneb
 Publisher: Şahin Özer
 Photography: Sevil Sert

Music videos
 "Bu Kız Beni Gormeli"
 "Beni Ağlatma" (There were two different versions of this music video)
 "Suç Bende"

Notes 

Mustafa Sandal albums
1994 debut albums